Homage to the Square: "Ascending" is a 1953 painting by artist Josef Albers. The painting is currently held by the Whitney Museum. The piece is from a larger series by Albers, called Homage to the Square.

References

1953 paintings